"Echa Pa'lla (Manos Pa'rriba)" [Shortening of Echa Para Allá (Manos Para Arriba)] (English version known as "Go Away (Hands Up)") is a Latin Grammy award-winning song  by American recording artist Pitbull for his seventh studio album Global Warming. The song features guest vocals from Papayo. It was released on Jul 16, 2012. It was produced by Gregor Salto, Todorov and Urales "DJ Buddha" Vargas. The song has achieved moderate chart success and has found its way in Billboard Top Latin Songs. It also peaked number 5 on the Billboard Tropical Songs Chart. It was also the official Miss Teen USA 2012 theme song. "Echa Pa'lla" won the Latin Grammy Award for Best Urban Performance. At the 2014 Lo Nuestro Awards, it won the award for Urban Song of the Year at the 26th Lo Nuestro Awards.

Track listing

 Digital download

"Echa Pa'lla (Manos Pa'rriba)" – 3:16
"Echa Pa'lla (Manos Pa'rriba)" [Single Version] – 3:19
"Echa Pa'lla (Manos Pa'rriba) [English Version]" – 3:19

Charts

Credits and personnel
Credits and personnel for the track includes:

 Armando C. Perez – vocals, songwriter
 Manuel Corao – songwriter
 Urales "DJ Buddha" Vargas – songwriter, record producer
 Tzvetin Todorov – songwriter, producer

References

2012 songs
2012 singles
Miss Teen USA
Pitbull (rapper) songs
Spanish-language songs
RCA Records singles
Latin Grammy Award for Best Urban Fusion/Performance
Songs written by Gregor Salto
Songs written by Pitbull (rapper)
Songs written by DJ Buddha
Song recordings produced by DJ Buddha